Tân Ninh is a commune (xã) and village in Quảng Ninh District, Quảng Bình Province, in Vietnam. This commune is 20 km south of the district capital town, Quan Hau. It has an area of 11.567 km2, population as of 2006 was 5,161 inhabitants. To the south it borders communes of Vạn Ninh and An Ninh, to the southeast it borders Hồng Thủy in district of Lệ Thủy, to the east is communes of Gia Ninh, to the north is commune of Duy Ninh, to the west is commune of Hiền Ninh. The communes contains six villages: Quảng Xá, Hòa Bình, Nguyệt Áng, Thế Lộc, Hữu Tân, and Tân Thành.

References

Populated places in Quảng Bình province
Communes of Quảng Bình province